The Togolese Ambassador in Washington, D. C. is the official representative of the Government in Lomé to the Government of the United States.

List of ambassadors 

Togo–United States relations

References

 
United States
Togo